Xiamen Xiang'an International Airport  is an airport being built to serve the city of Xiamen in Fujian Province, China. Once completed (estimated in 2025), it will replace the existing Xiamen Gaoqi International Airport as the city's main airport. The airport is located on the Dadeng Island in Xiang'an District, facing Nan'an, Quanzhou to the north.

Facilities
The airport will have three runways, which are 3,800 meters long, respectively (class 4F). It will have a  terminal building designed in the Dacuo architectural style native to the Minnan region. It is projected to serve 62 million passengers and 1 million tons of cargo annually by 2030, and it will be expanded to serve 85 million passengers and 2 million tons of cargo annually by 2040.

Airspace concern
As the airport is only  from Kinmen Airport, there is about 70% of airspace overlapping each other, and the directions of runways are also similar. Together with cross-Strait tensions, the problem of aviation safety has become an issue.

History
The feasibility study report of the airport was approved by the NDRC on April 29, 2021. The airport is scheduled to open in 2025.

Transport
It will be served by Line 3 and Line 4 of Xiamen Metro.

See also
List of airports in China
List of the busiest airports in China

References

Airports in Fujian
Proposed airports in China
Transport in Xiamen